Dunedin Academic Press Ltd (Dunedin) is a small independent academic publisher in Edinburgh, Scotland which publishes mainly books for the tertiary (undergraduate) level and periodically for postgraduate/research audiences. It has a London office as well. Dunedin also publishes books appealing to non-specialist adults interested in learning more about geology. Graham Park's Introducing Geology, now in its Second Edition, is a notable example. Dunedin's Introducing Earth and Environmental Sciences series, of which Introducing Geology was the first title now contains books covering topics in Astronomy, Meteorology and Oceanography as well as a lengthening list of geology and other earth science topics. "The Abyss of Time" by Paul Lyle won the Association for Science Education Book of the Year award in 2017.

Dunedin publishes about fifteen new titles a year, and has strong titles as it has concentrated its list on the fields of Earth Science; Child Protection (notably the Protecting Children and Young People series; and Health & Social Care.

Education (Policy & Practice series); comparative religion with the Understanding Faith series  and texts by teachers of singing, including The Student Voice (2010) and The Human Nature of the Singing Voice (2007). are other subject areas in which the company has published although they are no longer a primary focus.

Dunedin is distributed in North America by the Independent Publishers Group (IPG)  and throughout the rest of the world by Turpin Distribution <ref>[Turpin Distribution list of clients (July 2015) </ref> Dunedin Academic Press is a member of [http://www.publishers.org.uk/about-us/members-directory/?char=D The Publishing Association, the major publishing trade body in the UK   and Publishing Scotland, the network body for the publishing industry in Scotland .

References

External links
Official website
Books published by Dunedin Academic Press on WorldCat

Companies based in Edinburgh
Scottish literature
Book publishing companies of Scotland
Academic publishing companies
Small press publishing companies
Textbook publishing companies